The Abbot and then Commendator of Melrose was the head of the monastic community of Melrose Abbey, in Melrose in the Borders region of Scotland. The abbots of the earlier Northumbrian foundation from Lindisfarne are not included here. The second abbey was founded in 1136 on the patronage of David I (Dabíd mac Maíl Choluim), King of Scots, by Cistercian monks from Rievaulx Abbey, Yorkshire. Control of the abbey was secularized in the 16th century and after the accession of James Stewart, the abbey was held by commendators. The last commendator, James Douglas of Lochleven, resigned the abbacy to William Douglas, 6th Earl of Morton (his nephew) in December 1606, and the abbey itself to the king in 1608. The abbey (or most of its lands) was then erected into a secular lordship for viscount Haddington, John Ramsay, who in 1609 was created "Lord Melrose". Lochleven however resumed the title of commendator in 1613 until his death in 1620.

List of Abbots
 Richard, 1136-1148
 St. Waltheof, 1148-1159
 William, 1159-1170
 Jocelin, 1170-1174
 Laurence, 1175-1178
 Ernald, 1179-89
 Reiner, 1189-94
 Radulf (I), 1194-1202
 William, 1202-06
 Patrick, 1206-07
 Adam, 1207-13
 Hugh de Clipstone, 1214-15
 William de Courcy, 1215-6
 Radulf II, 1216-1219
 Adam de Harkarres, 1219-46
 Matthew, 1246-61
 Adam of Maxton, 1261-67
 John de Edrom (or Ederham), 1267-68 x 69
 Robert de Keldeleth, 1269-73
 Patrick de Selkirk, 1273–96
 ???
 William de Fogo, 1310–1329
 Thomas de Soutra, 1333 x 1335-x1342
 William de St Andrews, 1342–1376
 Gilbert de Roxburgh, 1391–1392
 David Benyng (or Binning), 1394–1422
 John Fogo, 1425–1434
 Richard Londy (or Lundy), 1440–1444
 Andrew Hunter, 1444-1465
 Robert Blackadder, 1471–1483
 Richard Lamb, 1472-1483
 John Brown (or Carnecorss), 1483–1486
 ???, 1486
 ???, 1486
 David Brown, 1486-1507/10
 Bernard Bell, rival to David Brown, 1486–1503
 William Turnbull, rival to David Brown, 1503-1507
 Robert Betoun, 1507/10-1521 x 1524
 John Maxwell, 1524-1526
 Andrew Durie, 1525-1541

List of Commendators
 James Stewart, 1535-1557
 Louis de Guise, 1558-1559
 James Balfour, 1559–1564
 Michael Balfour, 1564–1568
 James Douglas of Lochleven, 1569-1620

Notes

Bibliography
 Cowan, Ian B. & Easson, David E., Medieval Religious Houses: Scotland With an Appendix on the Houses in the Man, Second Edition, (London, 1976), pp. 76–77
 Fawcett, Richard, & Oram, Richard, Melrose Abbey, (Stroud, 2004)
 Watt, D.E.R. & Shead, N.F. (eds.), The Heads of Religious Houses in Scotland from the 12th to the 16th Centuries (The Scottish Records Society, New Series, Volume 24), (Edinburgh, 2001), pp. 149–55

 Abbots of Melrose
Melrose
Scotland religion-related lists